Adolph Joseph Bieberstein (December 17, 1902 – December 1981) was an American football guard who played in the National Football League (NFL) for the Green Bay Packers and the Racine Tornadoes.  Bieberstein played college football at the University of Wisconsin–Madison. He played one season in the NFL before retiring after the 1926 season.

References

1902 births
1981 deaths
American football guards
Green Bay Packers players
Racine Legion players
Wisconsin Badgers football players
People from Phillips, Wisconsin
Players of American football from Wisconsin